Thibault Isabel (born 29 April 1978) is a French writer and publisher.

Biography
Thibault Isabel was born in Roubaix on 29 April 1978. He obtained a doctorate in film studies from the Charles de Gaulle University – Lille III in 2004 with a dissertation on American cinema from 1981 to 2000. He is the editor of the website Linactuelle.fr which he founded in 2018 and participates in Michel Onfray's magazine Front Populaire, launched in 2020.

With Onfray, Isabel shares an interest in the anarchist thinker Pierre-Joseph Proudhon, about whom he has written a book, Pierre-Joseph Proudhon. L'anarchie sans le désordre (2017). Like Benoist, he is a neopagan, influenced by Max Weber's conception of modern polytheism and the non-romantic strain of pagan revivalism represented by Louis Ménard. He has written a book about pagan philosophy, Manuel de sagesse païenne (2020). There, he writes that thinkers like Aristotle and Confucius did not derive their morals from divine revelations, but from practical wisdom from the attempts to create harmony, and stresses that ancient morality was based on the recognition of limits. He views pagan thought as the viable way for contemporary people to discover the morals that are needed in order for a society to produce something of value, and also ties it in with environmental concerns. In 2021 he published an interview book with the philosopher Dany-Robert Dufour.

Selected publications
 La fin de siècle du cinéma américain 1981–2000, La Méduse 2006
 Pierre-Joseph Proudhon. L'anarchie sans le désordre,  2017
 Manuel de sagesse païenne, Le Passeur 2020
 Fils d'anar et philosophe (interviews with Dany-Robert Dufour), R&N 2021

References

Further reading

External links

 Personal website 

1978 births
Living people
21st-century French male writers
21st-century French non-fiction writers
French magazine publishers (people)
French modern pagans
Modern pagan writers
New Right (Europe)
People from Roubaix